Smołdziński Las  (German: Holzkathen) is a village in the administrative district of Gmina Smołdzino, within Słupsk County, Pomeranian Voivodeship, in northern Poland.

Before 1648, the area was part of Duchy of Pomerania, 1648-1945 Prussia and Germany.

The village has a population of 244.

See also
History of Pomerania

References

Villages in Słupsk County